Blue on the Bay is a skyscraper in the City of Miami, Florida, United States. It is located in the northern part of the city, near Midtown Miami and in the Edgewater neighborhood. Completed in 2005, it was part of the recent building boom in Miami. Floors 1-3 are used for retail, and floors 4-36 are residential units. The building is located between Northeast 36th Street and Interstate-195 at Northeast 5th Avenue.

See also
List of tallest buildings in Miami

References

External links 
Blue on the Bay, from Emporis

Gallery

Buildings and structures completed in 2005
Residential skyscrapers in Miami
2005 establishments in Florida
Arquitectonica buildings